Silene flavescens are flowering plants part of the genus Silene, family Caryophyllaceae. They are widely distributed and are found in the northern hemisphere. They are native to Hungary and the Balkan Peninsula. It is an herbaceous species belonging to the tribe Sileneae

Description 
They can be found in the serpentine areas of the Rhodope mountains. They are native to Mt Orvilos on the southern Green flank of the mountain. It also appears on the Bulgarian side of Mt Slavjanka. The stub has been collected in northern most Greece since 1977. Their flowering period is from mid-April to early May. Petal limb ranges from 3 to 6 millimeters. The length of the anthophore is between 1 and 2 millimeters. The plant lacks glandular hairs and the stamens are included.

Life Cycle 
Mitochondrial and chloroplast genomes are inherited maternally.

References

flavescens